Revelles is a commune in the Somme department in Hauts-de-France in northern France.

Geography

Population

History
A Gallo-Roman settlement was unearthed within the confines of the commune, during the construction of the A29 motorway.

Places of interest
 The church
 The mairie
 A war memorial
 Some stone wells

See also
Communes of the Somme department

References

Communes of Somme (department)